Some Like It Modern is an album by The Three Sounds which was recorded in New York in 1963 and released on the Mercury label.

Track listing
All compositions by Gene Harris except where noted
 "Caesar and Cleopatra" (Alex North) − 2:48
 "After Hours" (Avery Parrish) − 2:45
 "On the Sunny Side of the Street" (Jimmy McHugh, Dorothy Fields) − 2:58
 "Mr. Lucky" (Henry Mancini) − 2:47
 "I'm Gettin' Sentimental Over You" (George Bassman, Ned Washington) − 3:10
 "Rat Down Front" − 3:10
 "Lazy River" (Hoagy Carmichael, Sidney Arodin) − 2:12
 "Sentimental Journey" (Les Brown, Ben Homer, Bud Green) − 3:29
 "There's Something Nice About the Rain" − 2:35
 "Let's Dance"  (Gregory Stone, Josef Bonime, Fanny Baldridge) − 2:32
 "Elbows and Armpits" − 5:13

Personnel
Gene Harris − piano
Andy Simpkins − bass
Bill Dowdy − drums

References

1963 albums
The Three Sounds albums
Mercury Records albums
Albums produced by Quincy Jones